Lucas Faggioli (born 11 February 1997) is an Argentine professional footballer who plays as a defender for Colegiales.

Career
Faggioli's senior career got underway with Colegiales of Primera B Metropolitana. He made the breakthrough during the 2017–18 campaign, appearing for his professional debut on 18 March 2018 against Sacachispas. He made five further appearances under Leonardo Estévez as they placed fifteenth.

Career statistics
.

References

External links

1997 births
Living people
Place of birth missing (living people)
Argentine footballers
Association football defenders
Primera B Metropolitana players
Club Atlético Colegiales (Argentina) players